Abhayanand is an IPS officer and educationalist who, along with Anand Kumar, conceptualised Super 30 to teach poor students to crack IIT JEE. Following his graduation from Patna Science College, Abhayanand was selected as the IPS officer for the Bihar cadre after clearing UPSC Civil Services Examination in 1977. 
He was the ADG (headquarters) in 2006 and as such he concentrated on the speedy trial of Arms Act cases in Bihar. Later, during his tenure as the ADG of Bihar Military Police, Patna, he motivated the constables to donate from their salaries to convert a dilapidated government hospital into a modern nursing home with state-of-the-art facilities for treatment of the police force and their family members. Abhayanand was appointed as D.G.P. Bihar in August 2011, following the footsteps of his late father, Mr. Jagdanand, who was the 28th D.G.P., Bihar in 1985–86.

Career

Director General of Police
Abhayanand was appointed as DGP Bihar on 25 August 2011. He took charge as the 48th DGP of the state on 31 August 2011. He served as the DGP of Bihar from 2011 to 2014.

Speedy trial
Abhayanand is said to be the brain behind the speedy trial and convictions of criminals in Bihar. India. The District Judiciary, in 2010 alone, convicted 14,311 persons in speedy trials out of which 37 persons were awarded capital punishment and 1,875, life imprisonment. As Abhayanand had envisioned, this instilled the fear of law in the lawbreakers. This initiative has drawn the attention of many across the world. Princeton Review has done a study on this.

Special Auxiliary Force
To deal with shortage of manpower in the police, Abhayanand came up with the idea of recruiting retired army men. Given that the ex-army men were already trained in arms and combat, there was no ramp up time needed for them. They were ready to contribute from day one. The state government adopted this idea and in few days 5000 ex-army men were recruited by the Bihar state police force. This concept soon became a role model and other states such as Orissa, Madhya Pradesha and Jharkhand started recruiting ex-army men.

Super 30

Abhayanand conceptualized the program along with Anand Kumar.Super 30, a free tutorial to coach 30 bright youngsters from underprivileged families of rural Bihar for the IIT entrance test. Both of his children went to IIT before Super 30 started. He wanted to give an opportunity to talented children from poor families to compete with the more privileged ones for the IIT Joint Entrance Examination. Students for this program were selected through a competitive exam followed by an interview. The students who got selected then had to live at one place and prepare for the IIT-JEE under the academic mentorship of Anand Kumar and Abhayanad. He started this endeavour in 2003 when 18 children qualified for entrance test and then consequently 22 in 2004, 26 in 2005, 28 in 2006, 30 in 2007 and 30 again in 2008.

Rahmani 30

From 2003 to 2008 Abhayanand used to coach the students along with Anand Kumar. However, he split from Kumar in 2007 and then wanted to take his social experiment to a wider forum so that more under-privileged but talented children can benefit out of it. He joined a program called Rahmani 30 headed by Maulana Wali Rahmani where under-privileged Muslim students were selected and then coached for the JEE. In the inaugural year of Rahmani 30, 2009 all of the 10 students part of this program had cleared JEE. In 2010, 4 students out of 12 cracked entrance test. 15 out of 30 Rahmani students cleared the exam in 2011.

Other Super 30
Abhayanand also provides academic mentor ship to various such programs run by CSRL. These programs include Oil India Super 30 Assam (Guwahati/Jorhat/Dibrugarh), National Super 100 Delhi, GAIL Utkarsh Super 100 Kanpur. These programs are sponsored by various Indian PSUs (Public Sector Undertakings) such as GAIL, Powergrid, Oil India Limited. In 2011, 12 out of 20 students cracked the entrance test, 8 out of 20 qualified from Kanpur and 1 out of 3 passed the examination from Guwahati.

Abhayanand also wanted the society to realize its potential by helping the underprivileged children to compete for one of the toughest examination of India. He provides academic mentorship to students of Magadh Super30, a program run by the people of Gaya on similar lines as Super30. Magadh Super 30 was started in 2008. In 2011 2 out of 16 students cracked the IIT entrance test. Another such program Triveni Super 30 is run by Triveni Shubhakaran Trust, Calcutta in Patna which is also mentored by Abhayanand. 8 out of 15 students from Triveni Super 30 passed the IIT entrance test in 2011.

TEDx Talk
He gave a TEDx talk at TEDx Bankipur. He said for him a teacher's definition is, " One who doesn't give the right answer but keeps asking the right questions."

Autobiography

In August 2022, Abhayanand wrote his autobiography titled Unbounded: My Experiments with Law, Physics, Policing and Super 30.

References

Indian police officers
Scholars from Bihar
Living people
Bihar cadre civil servants
Year of birth missing (living people)
St. Xavier's Patna alumni
People from Patna